George Allen Smith (May 31, 1892 – January 7, 1965) born in Byram, Connecticut, was a pitcher for the New York Giants (1916–19), Cincinnati Reds (1918), Brooklyn Robins (1918 and 1923) and Philadelphia Phillies (1919–22).

He helped the Giants win the 1917 National League Pennant.

He led the National League in home runs allowed in 1920 (10) and losses in 1921 (20).

He ranks 90th on the MLB Career Walks/9IP List (2.01).

In 8 seasons he had a 41–81 win–loss record, 229 games (118 started), 52 complete games, 5 shutouts, 78 games finished, 4 saves,  innings pitched, 1,321 hits allowed, 643 runs allowed, 494 earned runs allowed, 54 home runs allowed, 255 walks, 263 strikeouts, 26 hit batsmen, 23 wild pitches, 4,874 batters faced, 3 balks, a 3.89 ERA and a 1.378 WHIP.

He went to college at Columbia University and died in Greenwich, Connecticut, at the age of 72.

Sources

1892 births
1965 deaths
Baseball players from Connecticut
Major League Baseball pitchers
New York Giants (NL) players
Cincinnati Reds players
Brooklyn Robins players
Philadelphia Phillies players
Columbia Lions baseball players
Indianapolis Indians players
St. Petersburg Saints players
People from Greenwich, Connecticut